Kasteel Lagendal is a country house in Lummen, in the province of Limburg, Belgium. It was built in 1850 in a vernacular late classical style as a shooting box commissioned by Paul Jacobs-Stellingwerff of Hasselt. Its name comes from its site on the longest point of the Lummen. Until 2005, renamed Kasteel Saint-Paul, it housed an up-market French restaurant.

See also
List of castles in Belgium

External links
Kastelenroute: a bicycle tour of country houses (kastellen) in Heusden, Zolder and Lummen.

Castles in Belgium
Castles in Limburg (Belgium)
Hunting lodges in Belgium